The Turks of the Dodecanese (lit. Turks of the Twelve Islands) are a community of 5,500 Turkish-speaking people and ethnic Turks as well as Greek Muslims living on the Dodecanese islands of Rhodes and Kos who were not affected by the 1923 population exchange, because the Dodecanese islands being under the rule of the Kingdom of Italy at the time. All inhabitants of the islands became Greek citizens after 1947 when the islands became part of Greece.

History 
As a result of this incorporation into Greece and due to the situation following the Cyprus conflict and the Turkish invasion of Cyprus in 1974 many Muslim Turks were expelled from the islands and forced to settle in Turkey. Many of them were deprived of their Greek citizenship and property. Some of those who stayed abandoned the Turkish language and their religion.

The Turks in Kos are partly organized around the Muslim Association of Kos Kos Müslüman which gives the figure 2,000 for the population they bring together and represent for the Greek island.

Those in Rhodes are organized around the Moslem Association of Rhodes Rodos Müslümanı, which gives the figure 3,500 for the population they bring together and represent for the island.

The more general term Adali is sometimes used (meaning "islander" in Turkish).

The president of their association Mazlum Payzanoğlu estimates the number in Rhodes as 2500 and in Kos as 2000.

See also
 Minorities in Greece
 Turkish minorities in the former Ottoman Empire
 Greek Muslims
 Turks of Western Thrace
 Cretan Turks
 Muslim minority of Greece

References

Bibliography 
 .

External links
 Website of the association of Turks from the Dodecanese settled in Turkey (in Turkish)

Turks in Greece
Dodecanese
Middle Eastern diaspora in Greece
Ethnic groups in Greece
Muslim communities in Europe